The 2015–16 Utah State Aggies women's basketball team represents Utah State University in the 2015–16 college basketball season. The Aggies, led by fourth year head coach Jerry Finkbeiner. The Aggies played their home games at the Smith Spectrum and were third year members of the Mountain West Conference. They finished the season 14–17, 8–10 in Mountain West play to finish in seventh place. They lost in the quarterfinals of the Mountain West women's tournament to Fresno State.

Roster

Schedule

|-
!colspan=9 style="background:#002654; color:#FFFFFF;"| Exhibition

|-
!colspan=9 style="background:#002654; color:#FFFFFF;"| Non-conference regular season

|-
!colspan=9 style="background:#002654; color:#FFFFFF;"| Mountain West regular season

|-
!colspan=9 style="background:#002654; color:#FFFFFF;"|Mountain West Women's Tournament

See also
2015–16 Utah State Aggies men's basketball team

References 

Utah State
Utah State Aggies women's basketball seasons
Aggies
Aggies